is the capital city of Kumamoto Prefecture on the island of Kyushu, Japan. , the city has an estimated population of 738,907 and a population density of 1,893 people per km2. The total area is 390.32 km2.

 had a population of 1,461,000, as of the 2000 census. , Kumamoto Metropolitan Employment Area has a GDP of US$39.8 billion. It is not considered part of the Fukuoka–Kitakyushu metropolitan area, despite their shared border. The city was designated on April 1, 2012, by government ordinance.

History

Early modern period

Shokuhō period
Katō Kiyomasa, a contemporary of Toyotomi Hideyoshi, was made daimyō of half of the (old) administrative region of Higo in 1588.
Afterwards, Kiyomasa built Kumamoto Castle. Due to its many innovative defensive designs, Kumamoto Castle was considered impenetrable, and Kiyomasa enjoyed a reputation as one of the finest castle-builders in Japanese history.

Edo period
After Kiyomasa died in 1611, his son, Tadahiro, succeeded him.
In 1632, Tadahiro was removed by Tokugawa Iemitsu and replaced with the Hosokawa clan.
Hosokawa Tadatoshi, the third lord of Kumamoto, was the patron of the artist and swordsman Miyamoto Musashi

Late modern period

Meiji period
The current administrative body of the City of Kumamoto was founded on April 1, 1889.

Showa period
On July 1, 1945, near the end of World War II, Kumamoto was bombed in an Allied air raid that destroyed one square mile, which was 20% of the city's area.

Contemporary history

After WWII
After the war, the Japanese Buddhist monk Nichidatsu Fujii decided to construct a Peace Pagoda atop Mount Hanaoka in the city to commemorate all those lost in war and to promote peace.
Inaugurated in 1954, it was the first of over 80 Peace Pagodas built by Fujii and his followers all over the world.

Heisei period
On February 1, 1991, the towns of Akita, Kawachi, Tenmei, and Hokubu (all from Hōtaku District) were merged into Kumamoto. On October 6, 2008, the town of Tomiai (from Shimomashiki District) was merged into Kumamoto. On March 23, 2010, the town of Jōnan (also from Shimomashiki District) and the town of Ueki (from Kamoto District) were merged into Kumamoto.

A series of earthquakes struck the area beginning April 14, 2016, including a tremor with moment magnitude 7.1 early in the morning of April 16, 2016.

Geography

Climate
Kumamoto has a humid subtropical climate (Köppen climate classification Cfa) with hot, humid summers and cool winters. There is significant precipitation throughout the year, especially during June and July.

Area

Wards
Since April 1, 2012, Kumamoto has five wards (ku):

Surrounding municipalities 
Kumamoto Prefecture
 Uki
 Kikuchi
 Tamana
 Uto
 Yamaga
 Kōshi
 Mashiki
 Kōsa
 Kashima
 Kikuyō
 Mifune
 Gyokuto

Demographics

Per Japanese census data, the population of Kumamoto in 2020 is 738,865 people. Kumamoto has been conducting censuses since 1920.

Government
Kazufumi Ōnishi has been the city's mayor since December 2014.

Working mother incident
In November 2017, Kumamoto politician Yuka Ogata was forced to leave the Kumamoto municipal assembly because she had brought her baby. The incident was reported by international media as an example of the challenges facing women in Japan.

Transportation

Local public transport is provided by the Kumamoto City Transportation Bureau.

Airways

Airports
Kumamoto Airport is located in nearby Mashiki.

Railways

High-speed rail
On March 12, 2011, work on the shinkansen (high-speed bullet train) network was completed, establishing a direct high-speed rail link to Tokyo via Fukuoka's Hakata station.
Kyushu Railway Company（JR Kyushu）
Kyushu Shinkansen：- Kumamoto Station -

Conventional lines
The JR Kumamoto station provides rail links to Japan's extensive rail network.
Kyushu Railway Company（JR Kyushu）
Kagoshima Main Line：- Tabaruzaka - Ueki - Nishizato - Sōjōdaigakumae - Kami-Kumamoto - Kumamoto - Nishi-Kumamoto - Kawashiri - Tomiai -
Hōhi Main Line：Kumamoto - Heisei - Minami-Kumamoto - Shin-Suizenji - Suizenji - Tōkai-Gakuen-mae - Tatsutaguchi - Musashizuka - Hikarinomori -
Kumamoto Electric Railway
Kikuchi Line：Kami-Kumamoto - Kankanzaka - Ikeda Station - Uchigoshi - Tsuboigawa-kōen - Kita-Kumamoto - Kamei - Hakenomiya - Horikawa -
Fujisaki Line：Kita-Kumamoto - Kurokamimachi - Fujisakigū-mae

Tramways
Trams run to a few suburbs near the downtown area.
Kumamoto City Transportation Bureau

Bus
A large bus terminus, called the Kotsu Centre, provides access to both local and intercity destinations.

Taxi
Several local taxi companies serve the Kumamoto metropolitan area and are the only 24-hour public transport in the city.

Roads

Expressways
Kyushu Expressway

Japan National Route
Japan National Route 3
Japan National Route 57
Japan National Route 208
Japan National Route 218
Japan National Route 219
Japan National Route 266
Japan National Route 387
Japan National Route 443
Japan National Route 445
Japan National Route 501

Seaways

Seaports
Port of Kumamoto

Ferry
Kyusyu Shosen：Kumamoto - Shimabara
Kumamoto-Ferry：Kumamoto - Shimabara
Korean Marine Transport：Kumamoto - Busan

Education

Universities
Kumamoto University
Prefectural University of Kumamoto
Kumamoto Gakuen University
Sojo University
Kyūshū Lutheran College
Shokei College
Shokei Gakuin University
Tokai University

Landmarks

Kumamoto Castle

The city's most famous landmark is Kumamoto Castle, a large and once extremely well fortified Japanese castle. The donjon (castle central keep) is a concrete reconstruction built in the 1970s, but several ancillary wooden buildings from the original castle remain.  The castle was assaulted during the Satsuma Rebellion and sacked and burned after a 53-day siege. It was during this time that the tradition of eating basashi (raw horse meat) originated. Basashi remains popular in Kumamoto and, to a lesser extent, elsewhere in Japan, although these days it is usually considered a delicacy.

Within the outer walls of Kumamoto Castle is the Hosokawa Gyobu-tei, the former residence of the Higo daimyō. This traditional wooden mansion has a fine Japanese garden located on its grounds.

Religious sites
The first of many peace pagodas around the world was erected by Japanese Buddhist monk Nichidatsu Fujii atop Mount Hanaoka beginning 1947.  Inaugurated in 1954, it was the first of over 80 built by Fujii and his followers all over the world.

Kumamoto is also the location of Takahashi Inari Shrine and Fujisaki Hachimangū.

Suizenji area
Kumamoto is home to Suizen-ji Jōju-en, a formal garden neighboring Suizenji Temple approximately 3 kilometers southeast of Kumamoto Castle.  Suizenji Park is also home to the Suizenji Municipal Stadium, where the city's football team, Roasso Kumamoto, used to play regularly.  The team now uses the larger KKWing Stadium in Higashi Ward.

Other notable sites
Miyamoto Musashi lived the last part of his life in Kumamoto. His tomb and the cave where he resided during his final years (known as Reigandō, or "spirit rock cave") are situated close by. He penned the famous Go Rin no Sho (The Book of Five Rings) whilst living here.

The downtown area has a commercial district centred on two shopping arcades, the Shimotori and Kamitori, which extend for several city blocks. The main department stores are located here along with a large number of smaller retailers, restaurants, and bars. Many local festivals are held in or near the arcades.

Cultural venues include the Kumamoto Prefectural Museum of Art and Kumamoto Prefectural Theater.

Culture

Sports

Sports teams
Baseball
Hinokuni Salamanders of the baseball Kyusyu Asia League are based in Kumamoto.
Football
Roasso Kumamoto in J.League is the local football club. 
Basketball
Kumamoto Volters of the basketball B.League are based in Kumamoto.
Volleyball
Forest Leaves Kumamoto of the Volleyball V.League（V2）are based in Kumamoto.

Sporting events
The Kumamoto Castle Marathon is a yearly event in Kumamoto City. It was established in commemoration of Kumamoto becoming a designated city in 2012. The city also hosted the 1997 World Men's Handball Championship and the 2019 World Women's Handball Championship.

External relations

Twin towns/sister cities
Kumamoto City is twinned with the following cities.

International
 Billings, Montana, United States
 Bristol, South West England, United Kingdom
 Guilin, Guangxi, People's Republic of China
 Heidelberg, Baden-Württemberg, Germany (since 1992)
 Helena, Montana, United States
 San Antonio, Texas, United States (since 1987)
 Ulsan, South Korea (since 2010)
 Kaohsiung, Taiwan (since 2017)

Notable people

 Aimer, pop singer and lyricist.
 Akari Ogata, judoka.
 Chisato Moritaka, pop singer and lyricist.
 Eiichiro Oda, manga artist, author of One Piece.
 Go Shiozaki, Japanese professional wrestler, currently signed to the Pro Wrestling Noah promotion and Chairman of the Noah Wrestlers' Association.
 Higonoumi Naoya, sumo wrestler.
 Inoue Kowashi, statesman.
 Isao Yukisada, film director.
 Kaji Yajima, educator, pacifist, president of the WCTU in Japan.
 Masahiko Kimura, judoka.
 Momoko Ueda, professional golfer.
 Noriko Kubo, Japanese female fencer.
 Rie Kugimiya, voice actress.
 Sayaka Hirota, Japanese badminton player. 
 Sayuri Ishikawa, enka singer
 Seiki Yoshioka, Japanese professional wrestler
 Shōdai Naoya, sumo wrestler.
 Tochihikari Masayuki, sumo wrestler.
 Tadako Urata, ophthalmologist
 Yōko Shimada, actress.
 Yokoi Shōnan, scholar and political reformer.
 Yuri Masuda, vocalist from the group m.o.v.e.
 Yuki Fukushima, Japanese badminton player. 
 Yuta Iwasada, Japanese baseball player.

References

External links

Kumamoto City official website 
Kumamoto City official website 
 

 
Cities in Kumamoto Prefecture
Populated coastal places in Japan
Port settlements in Japan
Cities designated by government ordinance of Japan